Teneyevo is the name of several rural localities in Russia:
Teneyevo, Alikovsky District, Chuvash Republic, a selo in Teneyevskoye Rural Settlement of Alikovsky District of the Chuvash Republic
Teneyevo, Yantikovsky District, Chuvash Republic, a village in Indyrchskoye Rural Settlement of Yantikovsky District of the Chuvash Republic
Teneyevo, Samara Oblast, a selo in Koshkinsky District of Samara Oblast